The National Broadcasting and Telecommunications Commission (NBTC), served by its operating body the Office of the NBTC, is an independent regulatory agency of Thailand. It is responsible for overseeing the country's broadcast and telecommunications industries, especially the regulation of radio frequencies.

The origins of the NBTC stem from the 1997 constitution, which envisioned transmission frequencies as a public resource to be regulated by an independent body serving the public interest. Parliamentary acts issued in 2000 in accordance with the constitution called for the creation of a National Telecommunications Commission (NTC) and a National Broadcasting Commission (NBC) to serve the roles. However, the appointment of the commissions was subject to much political manoeuvring, and the NTC had not been established when the 2006 coup repealed the constitution. The 2007 constitution instead called for the creation of a single regulatory agency, and the new Act on Organization to Assign Radio Frequency and to Regulate the Broadcasting and Telecommunication Services, B.E. 2553 was passed in 2010. The first 11-member commission of the NBTC, to serve under terms of six years, was appointed in September 2011, after a lengthy selection process which was subject to much public attention, not least due to the fact that over half of the appointees had military affiliations.

Major events overseen by the NBTC include, among other things, the auction of 3G and 4G frequency bands and Thailand's digital television transition.

Censorship
In November 2021, the NBTC office led by Lt Gen Peerapong Monakit, an NBTC commissioner, gave a warning to TV operators and concessionaires to reconsider carefully or even refrain from presenting content on some monarchy-related issues from the 2020–2021 Thai protests, in particular the 10-point monarchy reform manifestos. Media outlets viewed the move as a threat, while academics may be reluctant to express opinions on the monarchy for fear of being punished. Analysts said such self-censorship could put all public debate down.

See also
Telecommunications in Thailand

References

Independent administrative organizations of Thailand
Telecommunications regulatory authorities
Telecommunications in Thailand
2010 establishments in Thailand
Government agencies established in 2010